Demetrius Wright (born December 19, 1991) is an American football safety who is currently a free agent. He played college football for the USC Trojans.

Early years
Wright graduated in 2010 from Corona High School. As a senior defensive back and running back, he recorded 89 tackles with 1 sack, 5 deflections, 1 interception, 1 fumble recovery and 1 forced fumble on defense, and had 1,059 yards on 72 carries with 8 TDs and 10 receptions for 425 yards with 3 TD on offense. He was named a U.S. Army All-American Starter, a Super Prep All-American, Super Prep All-Farwest, Orange County Register Fab 15 first team, Long Beach Press-Telegram Best in the West, Tacoma News Tribune Western 100, and Riverside Press-Enterprise All-Riverside.

College career
Wright played in 12 games as a true freshman in 2010 at safety with 30 tackles and played on special teams.  In 2011, he was a co-starter strong safety, and will compete for a starting role against senior Jawanza Starling. Wright was listed as a co-starter with Starling on the official end-of-spring depth chart that was released on April 16, 2012. Wright had 86 tackles 4 TFL 5 PD as a senior starter 2013.

Professional career

Wright signed with the Miami Dolphins on May 15, 2014. He was released by the Dolphins on August 25, 2014.

He signed with the Winnipeg Blue Bombers' on February 4, 2015. He played in one game, a start, for the Blue Bombers in 2015.

Wright was signed to the Edmonton Eskimos' practice roster on August 9, 2016. He was promoted to the active roster on August 25. He played in three games, starting one, for the Eskimos in 2016.

Wright signed with the San Diego Fleet of the Alliance of American Football for the 2019 season. The league ceased operations in April 2019.

Personal life
Wright's brother, Daiveun Curry-Chapman, played college football at Northern Arizona.

Wright's mother, Dr. Marilyn Y. Curry-A-Keaton MS.,MA., DD. Pastoral Counselor, Social Service Practitioner and Certified Master Life Coach.

References

External links
USC bio

Living people
Players of American football from California
USC Trojans football players
1991 births
Sportspeople from Corona, California
American football defensive backs
Canadian football defensive backs
American players of Canadian football
Winnipeg Blue Bombers players
Calgary Stampeders players
Edmonton Elks players
The Spring League players
San Diego Fleet players